Small Hythe (or Smallhythe) is a hamlet near Tenterden in Kent, England. The population is included in Tenterden.

It stood on a branch of the Rother estuary and was a busy shipbuilding port in the 15th century, before the silting up and draining of the Romney Marshes. Small Hythe's quays and warehouses were destroyed in a fire in 1514 and were never rebuilt.

History

Small Hythe was within the medieval hundred of Tenterden, which does not appear to have existed at the time of the Domesday Book. It is first mentioned in about 1300 and received a charter in 1449 from Henry VI. 

Small Hythe lay on a branch of the River Rother. The settlement was made accessible to seagoing craft in the 1330s when the Knelle dam (an earthen bank at Wittersham Levels in the lower Rother valley, constructed to deflect floodwater from  the holdings of local landowner Geoffrey de Knelle)  diverted the main course of the river around the north of Oxney island. Large sea-going warships were built on the river banks from the fourteenth to the sixteenth centuries, with associated ship-breaking for reuse of fittings and timber. The ready supply of timber from the Weald made this isolated community one of the most important shipbuilding centres, other than the major ports, in the country. The town of Tenterden was given the status of a Limb of the Cinque Ports, with its consequent relief from taxation, in acknowledgement of providing royal warships built in Small Hythe.  A storm of 1636 carried away the dam and the river returned to its former course. Small craft were still able to reach Small Hythe until gradual silting put an end to this, early in the twentieth century.

Small Hythe appears as "Smalide" in the legal dispute about land in Tenterden and Small Hythe in 1460, and as "Smallitt" in the eighteenth century.

Notable residents

Actress Ellen Terry lived at Smallhythe Place between 1899 and her death in 1928. It is now managed by the National Trust and houses her collection of theatrical memorabilia and a small theatre.

References

External links

 Time Team Season 6 Episode 6: account of brief archaeological exploration of the shipbuilding areas 

Hamlets in Kent
Tenterden
Shipyards of England